Bucca is a rural locality in the Bundaberg Region, Queensland, Australia. The neighbourhood of Kolan is within the locality.

Geography 
The Kolan River flows through the locality entering along its south-west boundary with Monduran, Damascus and Bullyard and exiting the locality on its north-east boundary with Avondale and Moorland.

The district once known as North Kolan (or Kolan North) spans Bucca and neighbouring Moorland to the north.

The land is used for cropping, particularly sugarcane on the river flats, and grazing on native vegetation.

History 

Kolan takes its name from the pastoral run which in turn takes its name from the Kabi language, kalang meaning good.

In 1887,  of land were resumed from the Kolan pastoral run. The land was offered for selection for the establishment of small farms on 17 April 1887.

Bucca Crossing Provisional School opened on 26 August 1889. On 1 January 1909 it became Bucca State School. It closed on 17 October 1964. It was located at 172 South Bucca Road.

The Invicta Sugar Mill was originally located in Bucca near the Kolan River. In 1919, it was  relocated to Giru in the Shire of Burdekin where it continues to operate under the same name.

On 29 November 1992, a violent tornado damaged and destroyed multiple homes, with some being flattened to the ground. While this tornado is officially rated F4 on the Fujita scale, Jeff Callaghan, a retired senior severe weather forecaster at the Bureau of Meteorology said “the Bucca tornado was rated a F4 or possibly an F5.” Although the most violent Australian tornado with an official rating, the tornado did not kill or seriously injure anyone.

Education 
There are no schools in Bucca. The nearest primary schools are in Bullyard, South Kolan, Gooburrum, Avondale and Yandaran. The nearest secondary schools are in Gin Gin and Bundaberg North.

References

External links 

 

Bundaberg Region
Localities in Queensland